The 2012 Georgia Bulldogs football team represented the University of Georgia in the 2012 NCAA Division I FBS football season. The Bulldogs were led by 12th-year head coach Mark Richt and played their home games at Sanford Stadium. They were a member of the Eastern Division of the Southeastern Conference (SEC). They finished the season 12–2 overall and 7–1 in SEC play, claiming the East Division championship. They represented the division in the SEC Championship Game, where they lost to Alabama. They were invited to the Capital One Bowl, where they defeated Nebraska. The season included a sweep of three of Georgia's biggest SEC rivals (Florida, Auburn, and Tennessee) for just the fourth time (1980, 1981 and 2011).

Schedule

Schedule sources:

Game summaries

Buffalo

Missouri

Florida Atlantic

Vanderbilt

Tennessee

South Carolina

Kentucky

Florida

Ole Miss

Auburn

Georgia Southern

Georgia Tech

Alabama

Nebraska

Rankings

References

Georgia
Georgia Bulldogs football seasons
Citrus Bowl champion seasons
Georgia Bulldogs football